Raphitoma tomentosa is a species of sea snail, a marine gastropod mollusk in the family Raphitomidae.

This is a taxon inquirendum.

Description

Distribution

References

 Nordsieck F. (1968). Die europäischen Meeres-Gehäuseschnecken (Prosobranchia). Vom Eismeer bis Kapverden und Mittelmeer. Gustav Fischer, Stuttgart VIII + 273 pp

External links
 

tomentosa
Gastropods described in 1968